Perry Timothy Jecko (January 24, 1938 – January 11, 2005) was an American competition swimmer who represented the United States at the 1956 Summer Olympics in Melbourne, Australia.  He swam for the second-place U.S. team in the qualifying heats of the men's 4×200-meter freestyle relay.  Jecko did not receive a medal, however, because only relay swimmers who competed in the event final were eligible under the 1956 Olympic rules. In 1983, he acted on  Broadway in  Woman of the Year with Debbie Reynolds.

See also
 List of Yale University people

References

1938 births
2005 deaths
American male freestyle swimmers
Olympic swimmers of the United States
Swimmers from Washington, D.C.
Swimmers at the 1956 Summer Olympics
Yale Bulldogs men's swimmers